Belarus participated at the  Deaflympics from 1993 until it was banned in 2022, and won 87 medals. After the 2022 Russian invasion of Ukraine, the International Committee of Sports for the Deaf (ICSD) banned athletes from Belarus from that year's Deaflympics in Caxias do Sul, Brazil.

Belarus has yet to compete at the Winter Deaflympic Games.

Medal tallies

See also
Belarus at the Paralympics
Belarus at the Olympics

References

External links
Deaflympics official website
2017 Deaflympics

Nations at the Deaflympics
Belarus at multi-sport events
Parasports in Belarus